Ciegos de Siglos (Blind of Centuries) is the ninth album recorded by the Argentine rock band Vox Dei. The band found it hard to attain chart success with this LP and Vox Dei were later dropped by CBS in 1977.

Overview 
When Carlos Michelini walked out in early 1976 to move to Spain, Vox Dei included two guitars again: Raúl Fernández and Enrique "Avellaneda" Díaz, both members of La Máquina ("The Machine"). The LP sound adapts the mid-1970s hard rock, which caused many negative observers and critics from Pelo magazine. As their previous album, did not count on with any promotion from the label. In some ways, Ciegos de Siglos had a fusion of the styles not utilized on their previous releases, yet the material also shows traces of jazz rock and soul, particularly on the tracks "Reflexión de dos por miles a medianoche" and "Solo hoy te pertenece, mañana es ilusión".
 
On 2 December 2016, Vox Dei played together with Javier Martinez's Manal at Teatro Gran Rex, and released that same night the Ciegos de Siglos remastered edition, which features one outtake from the original sessions. The remaster issue is published by La Rompe Records (Vox Dei label) under Sony Music license.

Track listing
All songs written by Willy Quiroga and Raúl Fernández, except where indicated.

Personnel

Vox Dei
Willy Quiroga - Bass guitar and vocals
Rubén Basoalto - Drums and backing vocals
Raúl Fernández - Lead guitar and backing vocals
Enrique "Avellaneda" Díaz - Rhythm guitar and vocals

Additional Personnel
Guillermo Lechner - Sax on "Reflexión de dos por miles a medianoche".

Production
Nestor Gilardón - engineer
Oscar Gimenez - engineer
Roberto Labraga - mixing
A. Horacio Cusato - Artists and repertoire.
Design Cover by Vox Dei.
Art Cover by Oscar Álvarez and Willy Quiroga.
Remastered by Daniel Romero, assisted by Willy Quiroga.

Sources
Vox Dei discography (Spanish)

External links
Vox Dei's official webpage (Spanish)

Vox Dei albums
1976 albums